
Gmina Chotcza is a rural gmina (administrative district) in Lipsko County, Masovian Voivodeship, in east-central Poland.

Villages
Gmina Chotcza contains the villages and settlements of Baranów, Białobrzegi, Chotcza, Chotcza Dolna, Chotcza Górna, Gniazdków, Gustawów, Jarentowskie Pole, Karolów, Kijanka, Kolonia Wola Solecka, Niemieryczów, Siekierka Nowa, Siekierka Stara, Tymienica Nowa, Tymienica Stara and Zajączków.

Neighbouring gminas
Gmina Chotcza is bordered by the gminas of Ciepielów, Łaziska, Lipsko, Przyłęk, Solec nad Wisłą, Wilków and Zwoleń.

References
Polish official population figures 2006

Chotcza
Lipsko County